The Party of the European Left (PEL), commonly abbreviated European Left, is a European political party that operates as an association of democratic socialist and communist political parties in the European Union and other European countries. It was formed in January 2004 for the purposes of running in the 2004 European Parliament elections. The PEL was founded on 8–9 May 2004 in Rome. The elected MEPs from member parties of the PEL sit in The Left in the European Parliament – GUE/NGL group in the European Parliament.

Several member and observer parties participate also in the more radical European Anti-Capitalist Left. Before the PEL was founded, most of its members already held annual meetings together, as part of the New European Left Forum (NELF).

The current president is the German politician and economist . Swiss Brigitte Berthouzoz serves as the new EL treasurer.

The party supports Cuba, and a delegation visited the nation in February 2022.

As of December 2016, the Party of the European Left gathers 27 member parties, 8 observers, and 3 partners from 25 European countries.

Membership

Member parties

The Party of the European Left consists of member parties with full rights, observer parties, individual members and EL partners.

As of March 2023, The Party of the European Left has 25 member parties in 23 countries.

Full members

Observer members

EL-Partners

Former members

Party congresses
The party's first congress took place on 8 October 2005 in Athens, and produced the Athens Declaration of the European Left. The second congress was held 23–25 November 2007 in Prague. The third congress was held on 2–5 December 2010 in Paris. Its fourth congress was held on 13–15 December 2013 in Madrid. Its fifth congress took place on 16–18 December 2016 in Berlin, and elected German lawyer and politician Gregor Gysi as the new PEL President.

Leadership
President: Fausto Bertinotti (2004–2007), Lothar Bisky (2007–2010), Pierre Laurent (2010–2016), Gregor Gysi (2016–2019), Heinz Bierbaum (2019–present)
Leader in the European Parliament: Francis Wurtz (2004–2009), Lothar Bisky (2009–2012), Gabi Zimmer (2012–present)

See also
European Anti-Capitalist Left
European United Left–Nordic Green Left
Initiative of Communist and Workers' Parties
List of communist parties represented in European Parliament
Nordic Green Left Alliance
Now the People
Unified European Left Group

References

External links

Italian website

 
Political parties established in 2004
Pan-European political parties
International organisations based in Belgium
Socialist parties in Europe
Democratic socialism in Europe
2004 establishments in Europe
Eurosceptic parties